Stratford High School is a public high school located in Stratford, Texas (USA) and classified as a 2A school by the UIL. It is part of the Stratford Independent School District located in central Sherman County. In 2015, the school was rated "Met Standard" by the Texas Education Agency.

Athletics
The Stratford Elks compete in these sports - 

Basketball
Cross Country
Football
Golf
Track and field

</gallery>

State Titles
Boys Basketball - 
1946(B)
Girls Basketball - 
1969(1A), 1976(1A)
Football - 
2000(1A), 2005(1A), 2008(1A/D2), 2021(2A/D2)

General Information
Stratford High School is very competitive school with a lot of achievements to make the small community proud.

References

External links
Stratford ISD
Stratford Sports Network

Public high schools in Texas